Jordan Wassertheil Smoller (born October 13, 1961) is an American psychiatric geneticist. He is Professor of Psychiatry at Harvard Medical School and a Professor in the Department of Epidemiology at the Harvard School of Public Health. He also serves as Trustees Endowed Chair in Psychiatric Neuroscience and Director of the Psychiatric and Neurodevelopmental Genetics Unit at Massachusetts General Hospital. His other positions include being an associate member of the Broad Institute, vice president of the International Society of Psychiatric Genetics, and co-chair of the Cross Disorder Group of the Psychiatric Genomics Consortium. His laboratory at Massachusetts General Hospital, a division of the Psychiatric and Neurodevelopmental Genetics Unit, aims to determine the genetic basis of psychiatric disorders in both children and adults. In 2013, he was the lead author of a study examining genetic loci associated with an increased risk of five psychiatric disorders. Smoller is the son of Sylvia Wassertheil-Smoller.

References

External links
Faculty page at Massachusetts General Hospital

1961 births
Living people
American psychiatrists
Psychiatric geneticists
American geneticists
Harvard Medical School alumni
Harvard Medical School faculty
Harvard School of Public Health faculty
Harvard School of Public Health alumni
Massachusetts General Hospital faculty
Broad Institute people